Mycena alcalina, commonly known as the stump fairy helmet mushroom, is a species of fungus in the family Mycenaceae. It grows widely, ranging from North America to Europe.

Taxonomy 
Mycena is a genus of saprotrophic mushroom. It is characterized by a white/grey spore print, small conical (bell-shaped) cap, and very thin stem. The genus Mycena is fairly large and includes many species including Mycena alcalina, Mycena leptocephala, Mycena austera, and Mycena brevipes. Species found in the genus Mycena are typically known as bonnets.

Description 
The cap of Mycena alcalina ranges from conical to bell shaped and is generally 1–4 cm in diameter. The cap is supported by a thin, hollow stem growing anywhere from 20–65mm long. The cap appears black at first, but fades to a grey-brown colour around the edges, with the stem generally being the same colour as the cap. The flesh of Mycena alcalina ranges from white to translucent and is fragile and thin. This species of mushroom is edible, but it has a mild acrid taste and distinct bleach-like odour, making it unpleasant to eat.

Habitat and distribution 
Mycena alcalina is saprotrophic, meaning it derives nutrients from the breakdown of organic materials through use of extracellular enzymes. This particular species is found most often growing on the wood of coniferous trees. It can typically be found growing during the early summer and fall. Its geography is fairly widespread, being found in both North America and Europe. 
In North America, it grows predominately on the western coast. It can be found in habitats ranging from the old growth forests of British Columbia, throughout Washington and Oregon. It can also be found in other states, including Montana, Idaho, Maryland and Virginia. It is also found throughout Europe, generally growing in densely forested areas including Britain, Finland, the Netherlands, Norway and Spain.

Mycoremediation 
Mycoremediation, a form of bioremediation, is the process of using fungi to degrade or sequester contaminants in the environment. Some types of fungi are hyperaccumulators, and are capable of absorbing and concentrating heavy metals within the fruiting bodies. Some mushrooms produce large amounts of extracellular enzymes, which break down the toxins and render them inert or less dangerous. In the case of Mycena alcalina, it is believed that the bleach-like odor is due to this species ability to break down chlorinated compounds. There has also been recent research done with M. alcalina indicating it also has the ability to break down brominated compounds

References

External links 

E-Flora BC: Electronic Atlas of the Plants of British Columbia
Mycena in the Pacific Northwest: dichotomous key for identification of Mycenoid species

alcalina
Taxa named by Christiaan Hendrik Persoon
Fungi of Europe
Fungi of North America